Duponchelia fovealis is a species of moth of the family Crambidae described by Philipp Christoph Zeller in 1847. It is endemic to the area surrounding the Mediterranean Sea, and the Canary Islands, but has extended its range to other parts of Africa, Europe, the Middle East and North America.

Description

Adult wingspan is about 20 mm. The moth flies from May to June, depending on the location.

The larvae feed on various plants. Hosts include a wide range of mostly herbaceous ornamental plants and field crops, such as Anemone, Anthurium, Begonia, Cyclamen, Euphorbia, Gerbera, Kalanchoe, Limonium, Rosa, certain aquatic plants, corn, cucumbers,  peppers, pomegranate, tomatoes, and certain herbs.

Invasive pest in the US
The first record of Duponchelia fovealis in North America was in California where live larvae were detected in a shipment of begonias at a Home Depot in the city of Concord in Contra Costa County from the city of San Marcos in San Diego County (CDFA, NAPIS, 2005).  In the spring of 2005, this species was discovered in three greenhouses in southern Ontario, Canada.  In July, 2010, four male moths were collected in a pheromone trap in San Diego County, California. It is not known at this time if there is an established population.

On November 1, 2010, the USDA-AHIS announced this moth was present in at least 13 U.S. states.

References

External links

 Waarneming.nl 
 Lepidoptera of Belgium
 Duponchelia fovealis at UKMoths
  Duponchelia fovealis - pest of peppers, begonias and other ornamentals
 Duponchelia fovealis information and updates - University of Florida
 Duponchelia fovealis  on the UF / IFAS Featured Creatures Web site

Spilomelinae
Moths described in 1847
Moths of Europe
Moths of Cape Verde
Moths of Madagascar
Moths of Réunion
Moths of Seychelles
Moths of Asia
Moths of Africa